Charles Carroll "Tony" Eason IV (born October 8, 1959) is a former American football quarterback who played in the National Football League (NFL) for eight seasons, primarily with the New England Patriots. Taken 15th overall by the Patriots in the 1983 NFL Draft, he was one of the six quarterbacks selected during the first round. Eason served as New England's primary starter from 1984 to 1986, where he helped the team make their Super Bowl debut in Super Bowl XX. Competing as the starter with Steve Grogan throughout his Patriots tenure, Eason was released during the 1989 season. He spent his final two seasons as a backup with the New York Jets.

Early years
Eason grew up in Walnut Grove, California, and attended Delta High School in Clarksburg, California, a school with only 250 students at the time. His brother is former professional NFL player Bo Eason.  Despite an impressive high school football career, Eason's only scholarship offer from a Division I school came from the University of the Pacific in Stockton, California. However, he was denied admission due to poor grades, and he opted to attend American River Junior College in Sacramento, California. Eason spent two years playing football at American River in 1978 and 1979.

College career
Eason transferred to the University of Illinois and sat out the 1980 season. He was 6 feet, 4 inches tall, and weighed 205 pounds when he took over as the starting quarterback for the Fighting Illini in 1981. His first start for Illinois matched Eason against Pitt's quarterback Dan Marino; the Illini lost, 26–6, but Eason made an impressive debut as he completed 23 of 37 passes for 207 yards (slightly better than the 204 yards passing by Marino in the game).  In his first season with the Illini, Eason led the Illini to a 7-4 record, but the team was ineligible to play in a bowl game due to sanctions imposed by the Big Ten Conference.  Eason completed 248 of 406 passes (61.1%) for 3,360 yards  and 20 touchdowns.  The Illini ranked third in the nation in passing in 1981, as Eason led the Big Ten in passing efficiency and total offense and set nine conference records, including records for total offense, completions, passing yardage, and passing touchdowns.  He also edged out Art Schlichter as the quarterback on the Associated Press' All Big-Ten football team.

Eason earned the nickname "Champaign Tony" while playing at Illinois, based upon the city in which the university is located.

As a senior in 1982, Eason accumulated a school record 3,671 passing yards and led the Illini to a 7–4 regular season record and its first appearance in a bowl games since the 1964 Rose Bowl. He also broke five NCAA passing records in 1982 and tied four more. The NCAA records set by Eason in 1982 included most total yards per game in a career (299.5), most passing yards per game in a career (300.4), most completions per game in a career (23.9), and most total yards in first two seasons (6,589). Eason finished second in the voting behind Michigan's Anthony Carter for the Chicago Tribune Silver Football trophy as the Most Valuable Player in the Big Ten.

Eason's final game for Illinois was the 1982 Liberty Bowl, which also marked the last head coaching appearance of Bear Bryant for Alabama. Although Illinois lost the game, 21–15, Eason registered a record 433 passing yards in the game. Eason also threw four of the Illini's seven interceptions in the game.

In the 1983 East-West Shrine Game, Eason led the East team to 26–25 win over a West team led by John Elway. Eason completed 21 of 34 passes for 202 yards and two touchdowns in the game.

Eason still holds many of the school's all-time passing records, including the following:
 Passing yardage in a season – 3,671 (1982)
 Passing yards per game in a season – 333.7 (1982)
 Passing yards per game in a career – 300.4 (1981–82)
 Pass attempts in a season – 505 (1982)
 Pass efficiency in a season – 140.0 (1981)
 Pass efficiency in a career – 133.8 (1981–82)
 Most interceptions in a season – 19 (1982)
 Consecutive pass completions – 14, at Iowa, 10/30/82

Professional career

New England Patriots
Eason was selected by the New England Patriots in the first round (15th overall pick) of the 1983 NFL Draft.  He was one of six quarterbacks picked in the first round of the 1983 Draft along with John Elway (1st pick), Todd Blackledge (7th pick), Jim Kelly (14th pick), Ken O'Brien (24th pick), and Dan Marino (27th pick).

Eason appeared in 72 games (49 as a starter) for the Patriots between 1983 and 1989.  His best years were from 1984 to 1986 when he was the Patriots' starting quarterback.  In 1984, he completed 259 out of 431 passes (60.1%) for 3,228 yards and a passer rating of 93.4—third best in the NFL.  In 1986, he completed 276 of 448 passes (61.6%) for 3,328 yards and a passer rating of 89.2—fourth best in the NFL.  Eason also set an undesirable record in 1984 by being sacked 59 times for a loss of 409 yards; his 59 sacks were the most in NFL history at the time and currently stands as the ninth highest single season total.  Eason also led the NFL in interception percentage in the 1984 season with only 1.9% of his passes being intercepted.

Eason guided the Patriots to the AFC East title in 1986, but was defeated in the playoffs by John Elway and the Denver Broncos.

Super Bowl XX
In the 1985 season, Eason helped the Patriots clinch a playoff berth with a 34–23 win over the Cincinnati Bengals in the season finale highlighted by a 50-yard touchdown pass to Stanley Morgan.  Eason led the Patriots offense as they became the first team in NFL history to win three games on the road to reach the Super Bowl. He threw three touchdowns against the Marino-led Miami Dolphins in the AFC Championship Game, the first time New England had beaten the Dolphins at the Orange Bowl since 1966.

The Patriots made their first appearance in a Super Bowl in franchise history that year, meeting the Chicago Bears with Jim McMahon and Walter Payton. The Bears' famed 46 defense defeated Eason and the Patriots in Super Bowl XX, and Eason became the first starting quarterback in Super Bowl history not to complete a pass, going 0-for-6, and was sacked three times. Eason was replaced with Steve Grogan, but the Patriots still lost the game, by a final score of 46–10, which was the largest winning margin of any Super Bowl up to that time.

In 2008, ESPN ranked Eason's performance as the worst (82nd out of 82) in the history of the Super Bowl, noting, "In addition to his awful passing stats, he lost a fumble and not surprisingly was yanked in the second quarter."

New York Jets
Eason was claimed off waivers by the New York Jets during the 1989 NFL season, after Eason refused to take a cut in pay after he was demoted to fourth-string on New England's roster. He appeared in 18 games for the Jets in the 1989 and 1990 seasons, but only two as a starter.

Later years
In 2002, Eason was coaching basketball in the Sacramento area.

References

American football quarterbacks
New England Patriots players
New York Jets players
Illinois Fighting Illini football players
People from Blythe, California
1959 births
Living people
American River Beavers football players
Players of American football from California
Sportspeople from Sacramento County, California
People from Yolo County, California
People from Walnut Grove, California